The Districts of Abkhazia are the first-level subdivisions of Abkhazia, Georgia.

Districts are led by the Head of the Administration, who is simultaneously Mayor of the District's capital, except in the case of Sukhumi. The Head of the Administration is appointed by the President following consultations with the District Assembly. Previously, the Head was appointed from among the District Assembly members, but without consultations, but in practice the President would often appoint an acting Head from without who was subsequently elected to the Assembly. The current procedure was adopted by the People's Assembly of Abkhazia on 29 January 2016, over competing proposals to elect the Head directly by the District's population or by Assembly members, and after voting almost unanimously not to change the previous procedure on 30 July 2015.

List
 (1) Gagra
 (2) Gudauta
 (3) Sukhumi
 (4) Gulripshi
 (5) Ochamchira
 (6) Tkvarcheli
 (7) Gali

See also

References

 
Subdivisions of Abkhazia